The Department of Natural Resources and Environmental Control (DNREC) of the state of Delaware is the primary body concerned with the governance of public land, natural resources, and environmental regulations for the state.  DNREC is composed of several Divisions that have correlates in other U.S. State governments:

 Division of Air and Waste Management
 Division of Fish and Wildlife
 Division of Parks and Recreation
 Division of Soil and Water Conservation
 Division of Water Resources
The Department is headed by an 'Office of the Secretary'.

History
In April 2005, the first law enforcement shooting in the history of the Department took place.  The incident involved 2 park rangers and resulted in the death of a robbery suspect.

In 2007, DNREC completed the first version of the Delaware Wildlife Action Plan. This plan was a strategy to conserve all of native wildlife and their habitats. The plan will be incorporated into the duties of the Division of Fish and Wildlife.

In 2015, there was an updated version of the Delaware Wildlife Action Plan. This edition was a ten-year plan to conserve all fish and wildlife and their habitats. The plan lays out specific species which are in the greatest need of protection, their habitats, possible issues, research areas, and conservation techniques. The plan also focuses on increasing knowledge through education and outreach. These projects would be funded through federal State Wildlife Grants.

See also
List of Delaware state parks
List of Delaware state wildlife areas
Fishing in Delaware
Delaware Geological Survey
List of State Fish and Wildlife Management Agencies in the U.S.

Notes

References

External links
 Official DNREC Hunting Regulations
 Official DNREC Freshwater Fishing Regulations

Natural Resources
State law enforcement agencies of Delaware
State environmental protection agencies of the United States
Natural resources agencies in the United States